Physcaeneura pione, the light webbed ringlet, is a butterfly in the family Nymphalidae. It is found in north-eastern and western Tanzania, the Democratic Republic of the Congo, northern Zambia, Malawi, western Mozambique and eastern Zimbabwe. The habitat consists of moist savanna.

Adults are on wing from December to May.

The larvae feed on Siphonochilus species.

References

Satyrini
Butterflies described in 1880
Taxa named by Frederick DuCane Godman
Butterflies of Africa